Dichtelbach is an Ortsgemeinde – a municipality belonging to a Verbandsgemeinde, a kind of collective municipality – in the Rhein-Hunsrück-Kreis (district) in Rhineland-Palatinate, Germany. It belongs to the Verbandsgemeinde Simmern-Rheinböllen, whose seat is in Simmern.

Geography

Location
The municipality lies in the eastern Hunsrück between the Autobahn A 61 and the Bingen Forest. The village lies on the old Roman road, the so-called Via Ausonia (or Ausoniusstraße in German), which led from Trier to Bacharach. The municipality's namesake is a brook called the Dichtelbach, which empties into the Guldenbach between Rheinböllen’s main centre and its outlying centre of Rheinböllerhütte. The brook’s name was originally Dadilebach, which meant “Firebrook”, a reference to the many charcoal kilns in the woods along its course.

History
The village's namesake brook, the Dichtelbach, had its first documentary mention on 6 November 996, but it was another 351 years before a documentary mention that clearly implied that a village of that name existed. This document, dated 6 January 1347, dealt with tithes in Rheinböllen; the parish priest and the vicar shared them under this agreement with the former getting two thirds and the latter the rest. Witnessing this deed were several noblemen, among them “Frischo dictus Kunig de Erbach, Frischo, dictus Ritter, et Henne natus Fridemanni de Elren, Henricus dictus Starke et Contzo, dictus Hase de Dehtelbach”, the last one being the core of the documentary proof of the village's existence.

Henceforth, the area around the Dichtelbach was tied to the interests of the Archbishopric of Mainz, and in the time that followed, these interests eventually found their way into the Rhenish Counts Palatine's hands.

A document from 1368 makes clear that the villages of Dichtelbach, Ellern, Erbach and Kleinweidelbach (then known as Weidelbach; now an outlying centre of Rheinböllen) then together formed a Schultheißerei called the altes Gericht (“Old Court”). There is also proof that this Schultheißerei belonged to the Palatine Amt of Simmern under Count Palatine Stephan (1410–1425).

According to the Electorate of the Palatinate’s oldest book of fiefs from 1401, the Counts Palatine had enfeoffed 438 vassals with various holdings, among them several whom they had granted fiefs in Dichtelbach.

Further written sources only crop up from the latter half of the 15th century. Johann I made out to his wife Juliane von Nassau-Saarbrücken a Leibgedinge, a transfer of holdings for her benefit, that included several villages, among them Dichtelbach. The village’s name also crops up in a taxation list from Emperor Maximilian that dealt with the Gemeiner Pfennig, a levy of one Pfennig (or penny) imposed by the 1495 Diet of Worms (not the one commonly connected with Martin Luther). Everybody over the age of 15 had to pay this tax, with a further levy on those with assets of more than 500 Gulden. Maximilian’s list named 74 persons from Dichtelbach who were 15 or older. All together, they had to pay 3 Gulden, 5 Albus (“white pennies”) and 2 Pfennige (“pennies”). A Gulden was worth 24 Albus or 240 Pfennige.

According to the 1599 official description there were 25 hearths, that is, taxable family heads, in Dichtelbach, who all belonged to the Electorate of the Palatinate. Named as Schultheiß was a one Niklas Schiltger, who was supposed to be subordinate to the Schultheiß at Rheinböllen. Various noblemen held fiefs in Dichtelbach.

Beginning in 1794, Dichtelbach lay under French rule. In 1814 it was assigned to the Kingdom of Prussia at the Congress of Vienna. Since 1946, it has been part of the then newly founded state of Rhineland-Palatinate.

During the Cold War, American Patriot missiles were stationed for air defence on the Kandrich, a mountain near Dichtelbach. An old barracks in the woods still bears witness to this time, as do eight horseshoe-shaped protective barriers where today three wind turbines stand. Before the Patriots were there, the Kandrich was home to a radar station, which served to guide the Nike missiles stationed at the Grundlos-Wies, also nearby. Once the Cold War had ended, the military installation on the Kandrich was abandoned. The barracks and the military camp built at the Grundlos-Wies after the Nikes were withdrawn were also given up by 2006.

Population development
The following table shows Dichtelbach's population figures over the years, each time at 31 December:

Politics

Municipal council
The council is made up of 12 council members, who were elected at the municipal election held on 7 June 2009, and the honorary mayor as chairman.

Mayor
The position of mayor of Dichtelbach is vacant as of 2021. The former mayor, Martin Huhn, is acting mayor.

Coat of arms
The German blazon reads: 

The municipality's arms might in English heraldic language be described thus: Per pale Or a wheel spoked of six gules, a bend sinister wavy azure throughout and a hammer and sledge in saltire sable, all three in pale, and sable a lion rampant of the first armed and langued of the second.

The lion refers to the Dukes of Palatinate-Simmern, who once held sway locally. It also refers to the Electors Palatine. The two crossed mining tools refer to ore mining in the Dichtelbach area. The wavy bend sinister refers to the municipality's name (which ends in —bach, which means “brook”). The Wheel of Mainz stands for the Archiepiscopal Foundation of Mainz, the recipient of the Binger Wald (forest) from Otto III, Holy Roman Emperor on 6 November 996. This often cited as Dichtelbach's first documentary mention.

The arms have been borne since 16 March 1981, and were designed by Willi Wagner of Ohlweiler.

Culture and sightseeing

Buildings
The following are listed buildings or sites in Rhineland-Palatinate’s Directory of Cultural Monuments:
 Evangelical church, Kirchgasse – aisleless church, mid 18th century, west tower 1852
 Near Rheinböllener Straße 16 – hand pump
 Near Rheinböllener Straße 59 – fountain trough, Rheinböllen Ironworks, 19th century
 Rheinböllner Straße – village fountain, Rheinböllen Ironworks, 19th century

References

External links

 Municipality’s official webpage 
 Brief portrait of Dichtelbach with film at SWR Fernsehen 

Municipalities in Rhineland-Palatinate
Rhein-Hunsrück-Kreis